Fritz Czermak (24 March 1894 – 8 April 1966) was a German politician of the Free Democratic Party (FDP) and former member of the German Bundestag.

Life 
Czermak was a member of the state parliament in Hesse from 1950 to 1954 and was the parliamentary group chairman of the GB/BHE there until 7 November 1953. He was a member of the German Bundestag from 1953 to 1957.

Literature

References

1894 births
1966 deaths
Members of the Bundestag for Hesse
Members of the Bundestag 1953–1957
Members of the Bundestag for the Free Democratic Party (Germany)
Members of the Landtag of Hesse